Mehdi Essoussi (born 28 February 2001) is a Tunisian footballer who plays as a midfielder.

Early life
Essoussi was born in Tunis, Tunisia, before moving to Montreal, Canada, when he was one, followed by a move to Ottawa at age two. He began playing youth soccer at age four with the Nepean Hotspurs SC, before moving on to Ottawa South United and spending some time in the Ottawa Fury Academy. He then moved on to join the Toronto FC Academy. He also played with the Team Ontario provincial team and attended a Canada national team identification camp.

Career
In 2018, he began playing for Toronto FC III in the semi-professional League1 Ontario. He scored his first goal on 12 August against Sigma FC. He was named a 2nd team all-star at the end of the season.

On 27 September 2018, he signed his first professional contract with Toronto FC II to join them for the 2019 season. He made his debut on June 19 against the Lansing Ignite. On 21 May 2022, he signed a short-term loan with the first team Toronto FC.

International career
Eligible to represent both his native Tunisia and Canada, he was called up to the Canadian under-15 national team camp in 2016.

Career statistics

Club

References

External links
 
 

2001 births
Living people
Canadian soccer players
Tunisian footballers
Association football midfielders
Footballers from Tunis
Toronto FC players
Toronto FC II players
USL League One players
League1 Ontario players
Ottawa South United players
MLS Next Pro players